Eupithecia albicapitata is a moth in the  family Geometridae first described by Alpheus Spring Packard in 1876. It is found from Newfoundland and Labrador to western British Columbia, north to Alaska and Alberta, south to New England and New York.

The wingspan is 14–18 mm. The forewings are crossed by fairly wide orange-maroon basal and subterminal bands. The hindwings are crossed by a number of narrow, parallel partial lines. There is one generation per year with adults on wing from July to August.

The larvae bore the cones of various coniferous trees, including Picea glauca, Picea engelmannii, Pseudotsuga menziesii, Abies balsamea, Pinus resinosa and Pinus banksiana. The species overwinters in the pupal stage.

References

Moths described in 1876
albicapitata
Moths of North America